The Italian record progression women's 100 metres is recognised by the Italian Athletics Federation (FIDAL).

Record progression

See also
 List of Italian records in athletics
 Women's 100 metres world record progression

References

100 metres W